Sphyraena barracuda, commonly known as the great barracuda, is a species of barracuda: large, predatory ray-finned fish found in subtropical oceans around the world.

Distribution and habitat
The great barracuda is present in tropical to warm temperate waters, in subtropical parts of the Indian, Pacific and Atlantic oceans, from mangrove areas to deep reef, with a lower depth limit of 110 meters. They are reported to be declining in Florida, and the Florida fish and wildlife conservation commission are considering imposing catch limits.

Description
Great barracudas are large fish, and one of the largest of the Barracudas. The largest great barracuda was said to have measured .

The Great barracuda is blue-gray above, fading to silvery and chalky-white below. Sometimes, a row of darker cross-bars occurs on its upper side, with black blotches on each lower side. The second dorsal fin and the anal and caudal fins range from dark violet to black with white tips.

In general, barracudas are elongated fish with powerful jaws. The lower jaw of the large mouth juts out beyond the upper. Barracudas possess strong, fang-like teeth that are unequal in size and set in sockets in the jaws and on the roof of the mouth. The head is quite large and is pointed and pike-like in appearance. The gill covers do not have spines and are covered with small scales. The two dorsal fins are widely separated, with the first having five spines and the second having one spine and 9 soft rays. The second dorsal fin equals the anal fin in size and is situated more or less above it. The lateral line is prominent and extends straight from head to tail. The spinous dorsal fin is situated above the pelvis. The hind end of the caudal fin is forked or concave, and it is set at the end of a stout peduncle. The pectoral fins are placed low down on the sides. The barracuda has a large swim bladder.

Behavior and biology

Barracudas appear in open seas. They are voracious predators and hunt by ambush. They rely on surprise and short bursts of speed up to 27 mph (43 km/h) to overrun their prey, sacrificing maneuverability. Barracudas are more or less solitary in their habits. Young and half-grown fish frequently congregate in shoals.

Barracudas can reach at least 14 years of age. The spawning season lasts from April to October. Females can release about 5,000 to 30,000 eggs. The diets of these top predators of reefs are composed almost totally of fish, cephalopods, and occasionally shrimp. Large barracudas, when gorged, may attempt to herd a school of prey fish in shallow water where they guard over them until they are ready for another hunt.

Relationship with humans
Barracudas are scavengers, and may mistake snorkelers for large predators, following them in hopes of eating the remains of their prey. Swimmers have been reported being bitten by barracuda, but such incidents are rare and possibly caused by poor visibility. Barracudas may mistake objects that glint and shine for prey. 

Barracuda attacks on humans are rare, although bites can result in lacerations and the loss of some tissue. They are a popular target for recreational fishing, due to the strong fight they put up when hooked. However they are also known for the pungent odor they release upon being caught, and their meat has a chance of causing Ciguatera fish poisoning when eaten.

References

External links 

 
 
 

Sphyraenidae
Fish of Hawaii
Fish of the Atlantic Ocean
Fish of Cuba
Fish of the Dominican Republic
Fish described in 1771